The New South Wales Women's rugby league team represents the Australian state of New South Wales in Women's rugby league football. Also known as the Blues due to their sky blue jerseys, the team competes in the annual State of Origin series against the neighboring team, the Queensland Women's rugby league team.

History
The first state of Origin match began in 1999. Since that time, a 17-year reign had been completed by the Queensland side.

New South Wales won their first interstate challenge in 2016 after coming so close to winning in 2015, drawing with Queensland 4 all. New South Wales would then win back to back title winning in 2017. In 2018 New South Wales won the first ever Women's State of Origin match which was held at North Sydney Oval in mid-2018.NSW retained the shield with a win once again at North Sydney Oval in 2019.

Players
The next scheduled fixture for the New South Wales Women's Origin team is a match against Queensland on Friday, 24 June 2022. In late May 2022, the following players were named in an extended squad.

Current squad
Table last updated 26 June 2022. Tallies in the table include the 2022 match against Queensland.

Notes
 Age is at the match date 23 June 2022.
 2021 squad members Brydie Parker and Botille Vette-Welsh were unavailable for selection, each due to an injury that requires long-term recovery and rehabilitation.
 Corban Baxter was ruled out of the match due to injury.
 Emma Tonegato played for the New South Wales women's rugby league team in 2012 and 2013.
 An extended squad was named in mid-Aril 2022. Five players: Jaime Chapman, Taliah Fuimaono, Bobbi Law, Renee Targett, and Holli Wheeler from the squad named in mid-Aril were not named in the squad of 22 announced in late May. Three players were added: Sam Bremner, Kirra Dibb and Caitlan Johnston.

Key to icons used in the above table
 State Clubs:
 NSW:  Central Coast Roosters,  Cronulla-Sutherland Sharks,  Helensburgh Tigers (2021 only),  Mounties,  Newcastle Knights,  North Sydney Bears,  St Marys Saints, and  Wests Tigers.
 Qld:  Burleigh Bears,  Tweed Heads Seagulls, and  Wynnum Manly Seagulls
 All Stars:  Indigenous All Stars,  Māori All Stars,  All Stars
 City Country:  City,  Country.

Results

2006

2007

2008
The Woman's Interstate Challenge was played as a two-game series in 2008.

Game 1

Game 2

2009

2010

2011

2012

2013

2014

2015

2016 
Notes:

 This was the first time New South Wales won the trophy in all women's interstate challenge history.

2017

2018 
Notes:

 First official Women's State of Origin match.

2019

2020

2021

2022

See also

 New South Wales State team
 New South Wales Residents team
 New South Wales Under-20 team
 New South Wales Under-18 team
 New South Wales Under-16 team
 Holden Women's Premiership
 Harvey Norman NSW Women's Premiership
 New South Wales Women's Rugby League

References

External links 

 

New South Wales rugby league team
Rugby League State of Origin
Rugby league representative teams in New South Wales
Women's rugby league teams in Australia